The Communicator may refer to:

 The Communicator (or Dakom), the official student publication of the PUP College of Communication, Manila
 "The Communicator" (Star Trek: Enterprise), the 34th episode of the television series Star Trek: Enterprise
 The Communicator, student newspaper of Indiana University-Purdue University Fort Wayne
 The Communicator, student newspaper of Spokane Falls Community College 
 "The Communicator", a song by Madness from the 1999 album Wonderful